Surapur is a village in Shaheed Bhagat Singh Nagar district of Punjab State, India. The village is administrated by Sarpanch an elected representative of the village.

Demography 
As of 2011, Surapur has a total number of 355 houses and population of 1629 of which 769 include are males while 860 are females according to the report published by Census India in 2011. The literacy rate of Surapur is 78.94% higher than the state average of 75.84%. The population of children under the age of 6 years is 133 which is 8.16% of total population of Surapur, and child sex ratio is approximately 1180 as compared to Punjab state average of 846.

The population consist of obc which constitutes 100% of total population in Surapur. The town does not have any Schedule Tribe population so far.

As per the report published by Census India in 2011, 502 people were engaged in work activities out of the total population of Surapur which includes 465 males and 37 females. According to census survey report 2011, 80.08% workers describe their work as main work and 19.92% workers are involved in Marginal activity providing livelihood for less than 6 months.

Education 
The village has a Punjabi medium, co-ed upper primary with secondary school established in 1965. The school provide mid-day meal per Indian Midday Meal Scheme. As per Right of Children to Free and Compulsory Education Act the school provide free education to children between the ages of 6 and 14.

Amardeep Singh Shergill Memorial college Mukandpur are the nearest colleges.

Transport 

See also 
List of villages in India

References

External links 
 Tourism of Punjab
 Census of Punjab
 Locality Based PINCode

Villages in Shaheed Bhagat Singh Nagar district